Jadwiga Teresa Zakrzewska (born 4 November 1950 in Płońsk) is a Polish politician. She was elected to the lower house of the Polish parliament (the Sejm) on 25 September 2005, getting 4972 votes in 20 Warsaw districts as a candidate from the Civic Platform list. She ended her term in 2015.

She was also a member of Sejm 1997-2001.

See also
Members of Polish Sejm 2005-2007

External links
Jadwiga Zakrzewska - parliamentary page - includes declarations of interest, voting record, and transcripts of speeches.

Members of the Polish Sejm 2005–2007
Women members of the Sejm of the Republic of Poland
Members of the Polish Sejm 1997–2001
Civic Platform politicians
1950 births
Living people
20th-century Polish women politicians
21st-century Polish women politicians
Members of the Polish Sejm 2007–2011
Members of the Polish Sejm 2011–2015